Yuri Sergeyevich Pershin (born 3 March 1999) is a Russian football player. He plays for FC Murom on loan from FC SKA-Khabarovsk.

Club career
He made his debut in the Russian Football National League for FC Dynamo Bryansk on 1 August 2020 in a game against FC Orenburg, he substituted Pavel Baranov at half-time.

References

External links
 
 Profile by Russian Football National League
 

1999 births
Sportspeople from Khakassia
People from Abaza (town)
Living people
Russian footballers
Association football midfielders
FC Zenit Saint Petersburg players
FC Dynamo Bryansk players
FC SKA-Khabarovsk players
FC Tom Tomsk players
FC Chayka Peschanokopskoye players
Russian First League players
Russian Second League players